James (J.T.)Thomas Jr. (born April 22, 1951) is a former American football defensive back in the National Football League. He was drafted in the first round by the Pittsburgh Steelers 24th overall in the 1973 NFL draft. He was the first African-American football player to play football and graduate from Florida State University-Seminoles. Thomas played for the Steelers between 1973 and 1981, and was a member of the legendary dynasty Steel Curtain defense that won four(4) Super Bowls in the 70s. J.T.played for the Denver Broncos in 1982. Thomas and Mel Blount are rank #7 in the Top-10 Cornerback Tandems in NFL History.

Biography
Thomas attended Lanier High School in Macon. After playing at Florida State, Thomas was the Steelers' first-round selection (24th overall) in the 1973 NFL draft. That year, Thomas played in all 14 regular-season games and in the Steelers' only playoff game. He recorded one interception that season.

In 1974 and 1975, the Steelers won back-to-back Super Bowls. In 1974, Thomas picked up a career-best five interceptions and he scored a touchdown on a fumble recovery. Thomas was named to the Pro Bowl after a 1976 season in which he collected two interceptions and a fumble recovery. In 1978, he sat out the season due to an inflammatory disease in the lungs and lymph nodes known as Sarcoidosis.

During his time in Pittsburgh, Thomas played alongside cornerback Mel Blount. NFL.com named Thomas and Blount the sixth-best cornerback combination of all time.

During the 1982 preseason, Thomas was traded to the Denver Broncos for an initially undisclosed draft slot.

Thomas has lived in Monroeville, Pennsylvania, since the 1970s. Partnering with former Steeler Larry Brown in the late 1980s, They developed the Applebee's]] chain restaurants in western and central Pennsylvania and Morgantown, West Virginia markets. In 2009, he opened a Southern restaurant known as Red, Hot & Blue in Homestead, Pennsylvania. Thomas became a franchisee of Crazy Mocha, a Pittsburgh coffee chain in 2015. Currently, J.T. is Rum a Ambassador for PAPA’s PILAR RUM COMPANY located in Key West,Florida.

References

External links
Florida State Seminoles bio
J.T. Thomas not down & out, Rich Emert, The Beaver County Times, September 10, 1978

1951 births
Living people
Sportspeople from Macon, Georgia
Players of American football from Georgia (U.S. state)
American football cornerbacks
American football safeties
Florida State Seminoles football players
Pittsburgh Steelers players
Denver Broncos players
American Conference Pro Bowl players